The Olympic Committee of the Democratic People's Republic of Korea (IOC code: PRK) is the National Olympic Committee (NOC) representing North Korea (competing either as DPR Korea or as the country's full official name, the Democratic People's Republic of Korea).

It is a member of the Olympic Council of Asia (OCA), and of the Association of National Olympic Committees (ANOC). It is based in Kwangbok Street, Kumsong-dong, Mangyongdae District, Pyongyang. Its chairman is Kim Il-guk, Vice President Chang Ung, and Secretary General Son Kwang-ho.

History

Before the Korean War, the International Olympic Committee (IOC) recognized a single Korean National Olympic Committee (NOC) representing both the North and South Korea, based in Seoul. After the war, North Korea displayed dissatisfaction with this arrangement, and repeatedly called for the creation of a North Korean NOC. The IOC declined these pleas on the grounds that there could be only one NOC per country.

Regardless of the lack of recognition, the Olympic Committee of the Democratic People's Republic of Korea was founded in 1953 and it applied to join the IOC in June 1956.

In the 1957 session of the IOC, the Olympic Committee of the USSR asked the IOC to provisionally recognize the North Korean NOC on the grounds that the East German NOC had been admitted alongside the Olympic Committee of West Germany. Recognition was to be done under the condition that the two Korean NOCs would agree to send a unified team to 1960 Summer Olympics in Rome, but the plans failed due to opposition by the South's Korean Olympic Committee. The matter of a unified team was debated over the following sessions, and lobbied by the Bulgarian and Romanian NOCs, and in 1962 the IOC finally conferred provisional recognition on the North Korean NOC.

Talks about a unified team continued in 1963, but these talks failed after the NOCs could agree on nothing but the flag, which was to consist of the word "Korea" under the Olympic rings. North Korea joined the Soviet-led boycott of the 1984 Summer Olympics in Los Angeles. Between 1985 and 1988 the NOCs negotiated about co-hosting the 1988 Summer Olympics. The negotiations failed, resulting in North Korea boycotting the Games held in Seoul of South Korea.

On 8 September 2021, the IOC Executive Board suspended the Olympic Committee of the Democratic People's Republic of Korea (North Korea) through at least the end of 2022 for violations of the Olympic Charter, over its refusal to send athletes to the 2020 Summer Olympics in Tokyo due to COVID-19 pandemic-related concerns. There has been speculation about whether the IOC was also intending to send a message to nations considering a boycott of the 2022 Winter Olympics in Beijing, that they could be banned from participation in future Olympic Games if they chose to boycott this edition. However, North Korean Ministry of Sports and the National Olympic Committee said in a letter to the 2022 Beijing Winter Olympics Organizing Committee, the Chinese Olympic Committee, and the General Administration of Sport of China on 7 January 2022 that "Due to the "action of hostile forces" and the COVID-19 pandemic, they would not be able to participate in the 2022 Beijing Winter Olympics." In addition, the North Korean Olympic Committee said "supports all the work of our comrades in China to host a grand and wonderful Olympics. The United States and its followers are plotting anti-Chinese conspiracies to obstruct the successful hosting of the Olympics, but this is an insult to the spirit of the Olympic Charter and an act to damage China's international image. We firmly oppose and reject these actions."

National body members
The following national bodies have membership in the Committee:

 Amateur Athletic Association of DPR of Korea
 Amateur Basketball Association of DPR Korea
 Amateur Boxing Association of DPR Korea
 Amateur Swimming Association of D.P.R. Korea
 Amateur Wrestling Association of the Democratic People's Republic of Korea
 Badminton Association of the Democratic People's Republic of Korea
 Baseball and Softball Association of DPR Korea
 Democratic People's Republic of Korea Weightlifting Association
 DPR Korea Football Association
 Gymnastics Association of the Democratic People's Republic of Korea
 Handball Association of the DPR Korea
 Ice Hockey Association of the DPR Korea
 Judo Association of the Democratic People's Republic of Korea
 PRK Korea Rowing Federation
 Shooting Association of DPR Korea
 Skating Association of the Democratic People's Republic of Korea
 Table Tennis Association of the Democratic People's Republic of Korea
 Tennis Association of DPR of Korea
 The Volleyball Association of the D.P.R. Korea

2020 unified Korea team and 2032 co-host bid with South Korea
On November 2, 2018, officials from both North and South Korea announced that their countries would participate at the 2020 Summer Olympics, held in Tokyo, Japan, as a unified team. The officials from both Koreas also announced that the letters they would send to the IOC regarding their bids for hosting the 2032 Summer Olympics would also consist of co-host bids so that the Olympic activities would take place in both nations if their bids were accepted as well.

See also
North Korea at the Olympics

References

External links 
Olympic Committee of the Democratic People's Republic of Korea at the International Olympic Committee
Olympic Committee of the Democratic People's Republic of Korea at the Olympic Council of Asia
Olympic Committee of the Democratic People's Republic of Korea at the Association of National Olympic Committees
Documents by the Olympic Committee of the Democratic People's Republic of Korea at North Korea International Documentation Project

Korea, North
Oly
North Korea at the Olympics
1953 establishments in North Korea
Sports organizations established in 1953